The Alps 2 Ocean Cycle Trail is a cycle trail. This trail is as one of the projects of the New Zealand Cycle Trail. The trail has both on and off-road sections.

Funding for the trail from the New Zealand Community Trust budget was approved in July 2010, after the trail had been shortlisted as one of 13 from 54 nationwide proposals.

Sections 
The trail comprises eight sections, and from west to east descends from  down to sea level:

Aoraki/Mt Cook to Braemar Station 
The first section is the most remote of the trail and includes some unbridged stream crossings.

Braemar Station to Twizel 
Continuing on a gravel road over hilly terrain, this  section takes in the southern shore of Lake Pukaki and the hydro-electric system of the area around Twizel once on sealed roads. Towards Twizel, the cycle trail leads across Pukaki Flats, an area of tussock grasslands typical for the Mackenzie basin. Twizel is the largest town along the cycle path until the end at Oamaru.

Twizel to Lake Ōhau 
It partly follows canals that are part of the hydro-electric system connecting the glacial lakes. A cycle trail goes around the southern shore of Lake Ōhau, finishing on a sealed road to Lake Ohau Alpine Village and the Lake Ohau Lodge.

Lake Ōhau to Omarama 

Omarama to Otematata 
The first half of this  section over the Omarama Saddle is on a dedicated cycle trail next to SH83, the second half is on the state highway itself.

Otematata to Kurow 
An off-road 16-kilometre bicycling section was opened on 17 December 2020, from Sailors Cutting to the top of the Benmore Dam in the Waitaki Lakes region. $1.2 million was spent creating the section.

Kurow to Duntroon 

Duntroon to Oamaru 
The last section partly follows the Vanished World trail and past the Elephant Rocks on a mix of sealed public back roads and dedicated cycle trails. From Weston, the cycle trail follows an old railway line and enters Oamaru via the Oamaru Gardens. It finishes after  at Friendly Bay, adjacent to Oamaru's Victorian Historic Precinct.

Sites 
Sites on the trail include: • Aoraki/Mt Cook • Snow-capped Mountains • Golden Tussock Landscapes • Glacier Lake Tours • High Country Stations • Hydro Canals • Native Forests • Elephant Rocks • Limestone and Clay Cliffs • Maori Rock Art • Vanished World Fossil Sites • Boutique Shops • Museums • Lakes: Ōhau, Pukaki, Benmore, Aviemore • Historic Limestone Tunnels • Hydro Dams: Benmore, Aviemore, Waitaki • Vineyards • Oamaru's Victorian Precinct • Galleries & Gifts • Steampunk HQ, Oamaru • Blue Penguin Colony • Pacific Ocean

References

External links 

  of the Alps 2 Ocean Cycle Trail.

New Zealand Cycle Trail
Tourist attractions in Otago
Sport in Canterbury, New Zealand
Sport in Oamaru
Sport in Otago